Josep de Margarit i de Biure (1602, Castelló d'Empúries–1685, Perpignan) was a leader of the forces of the Generalitat in the Reapers' War.

He led the attack on Constantí, and took part in the Siege of Lleida and the Battle of Montmeló.

In 1641, Louis XIII of France made him Governor of Catalonia.

In later life, Louis XIV of France made him Lord of Thuir.

Sources 
entry at Biographie Rousillonaise (French)
Serrano, Angela Josep Margarit, un patriota catala a la revolta dels Segadors (Spanish)

Further reading 
Pella i Forgas, Josep Un baro illustre: Josep Margant i Biure, Barcelona, 1875 

1602 births
1685 deaths
Soldiers from Catalonia
People of the Reapers' War
People from Alt Empordà